Allobates vanzolinius also known as Vanzolini's rocket frog, is a species of frogs in the family Aromobatidae. It is endemic to the Amazonas state, Brazil. Its natural habitats are tropical moist lowland forest and rivers.
It is threatened by habitat loss.

Etymology
The specific name vanzolinius honors Paulo Vanzolini, a Brazilian herpetologist and composer.

References

vanzolinius
Endemic fauna of Brazil
Amphibians of Brazil
Frogs of South America
Amphibians described in 2002
Taxonomy articles created by Polbot